Rhytidopoma is a genus of land snails with an operculum, terrestrial gastropod mollusks in the family Pomatiidae.

Rhytidopoma is the type genus of the tribe Rhytidopomatini.

Species 
Species within the genus Rhytidopoma include:
Rhytidopoma clathratum (Gould, 1842)
Rhytidopoma coronatum (Poey in Pfeiffer, 1856)
Rhytidopoma hespericum Torre & Bartsch, 1941
Rhytidopoma honestum (Poey, 1851)
Rhytidopoma isabelae Aguayo & Jaume, 1953
Rhytidopoma nodulatum (Poey, 1851)
Rhytidopoma occidentale Torre & Bartsch, 1941
Rhytidopoma pinense Torre & Bartsch, 1941
Rhytidopoma rugulosum (Pfeiffer, 1839)
Rhytidopoma scalarinum Jaume & Sánchez de Fuentes, 1944
Rhytidopoma violaceum Jaume & Sánchez de Fuentes, 1944
Rhytidopoma wrightianum (Gundlach in Arango, 1881)

References 

Pomatiidae